Martina Hingis and Jana Novotná defeated the defending champion Natasha Zvereva and her partner Lindsay Davenport in the final, 7–6(7–4), 6–4 to win the ladies' doubles tennis title at the 1998 Wimbledon Championships. It was the third step in an eventual Grand Slam for Hingis.

Gigi Fernández and Zvereva were the reigning champions, but Fernández retired at the end of the 1997 season.

Seeds

  Martina Hingis /  Jana Novotná (champions)
  Lindsay Davenport /  Natasha Zvereva (final)
  Arantxa Sánchez Vicario /  Helena Suková (quarterfinals)
  Alexandra Fusai /  Nathalie Tauziat (second round)
  Yayuk Basuki /  Caroline Vis (third round)
 n/a
  Lisa Raymond /  Rennae Stubbs (semifinals)
  Katrina Adams /  Manon Bollegraf (third round)
  Conchita Martínez /  Patricia Tarabini (first round)
  Elena Likhovtseva /  Ai Sugiyama (third round)
  Naoko Kijimuta /  Nana Miyagi (third round)
  Barbara Schett /  Patty Schnyder (first round)
  Sabine Appelmans /  Miriam Oremans (first round)
  Catherine Barclay /  Kerry-Anne Guse (quarterfinals)
  Florencia Labat /  Dominique Van Roost (third round)
  Virginia Ruano Pascual /  Paola Suárez (second round)
  Mariaan de Swardt /  Debbie Graham (semifinals)

Qualifying

Draw

Finals

Top half

Section 1

Section 2

Bottom half

Section 3

Section 4

References

External links

1998 Wimbledon Championships on WTAtennis.com
1998 Wimbledon Championships – Women's draws and results at the International Tennis Federation

Women's Doubles
Wimbledon Championship by year – Women's doubles